Ciarán Sweeney (born 4 January 1971) is a designer, producer, broadcaster, and writer. He has done works for Madonna, George Michael, Elton John, Pink and Kylie Minogue and Kate Eyre. He has exhibited at The Irish Museum of Modern Art, Royal Dublin Society and Trinity College Dublin.

Early life

Sweeney was born and grew up in Ireland. He attended schools in Louth, Cork, Donegal and Sligo.

Career 
Sweeny majored in textiles at the National College of Art & Design in Dublin. Upon graduation he worked as an art teacher.

His design career began as costume designer to The Corrs.

Sweeny has shown internationally including in Dublin Castle, Ireland; The State Museum of Architecture, Moscow, Russia; and The Natural History Museum, London.
Academy Award nominee Brenda Blethyn, President Mary McAleese of Ireland, Harry Potter actress Evanna Lynch, and French model Satya Oblette are some of his well-known clients.

He has presented or contributed on design internationally including NTV (Russia), RTÉ (Ireland), CityTV (Canada) and BBC (UK).
Ciarán discovered IMG model Faye Dinsmore.

In show production he has produced and directed shows in The Irish Museum of Modern Art,  The Royal Dublin Society and Trinity College Dublin.
In 2011 he art directed the British singer Lisa Stansfield at Studio Harcourt, Paris.

He is currently based in Paris.

References

External links 

http://www.independent.ie/lifestyle/independent-woman/fashion/irish-accent-once-again-rings-proudly-at-lfw-2557998.html
http://www.rte.ie/tv/theafternoonshow/2009/0408/ciaransweeney741.html
http://www.rte.ie/tv/theafternoonshow/2009/0506/stylishhomes750.html
http://www.independent.ie/lifestyle/independent-woman/fashion/drawing-on-the-artist-within-496382.html
http://www.independent.ie/incoming/incoming_dailyfeed/these-pins-were-made-for-walking-on-the-worlds-most-glamorous-catwalks-2391627.html
http://www.irishtimes.com/newspaper/ireland/2011/0523/1224297548158.html
https://web.archive.org/web/20120325145805/http://www.irishfashionawards.com/judges

Living people
Irish fashion designers
Alumni of the National College of Art and Design
1971 births